Jerry P. Dyer (born May 3, 1959) is an American politician and former law enforcement officer. He is the 26th and current mayor of Fresno, California. Previously, he served as the chief of the Fresno Police Department.

Life and career
Dyer was born in Fresno to Donald Dyer and Anna Rackley on May 3, 1959. The Dyers relocated to Fowler, California, in 1964. He attended and graduated from Fowler High School in 1977. While in high school, Dyer played on the varsity football, baseball, and basketball teams. After high school, Dyer joined the College of the Sequoias police officer training academy and was sworn in as an officer of the Fresno Police Department on May 1, 1979, under then Police Chief George K. Hansen. Later his father and sister, Diana, would join Jerry in at the Fresno Police Department with his father previously serving in the Madera County Sheriffs Department. He served as a police officer in the Fresno Police Department for 22 years while rising through the ranks before being named chief of police in 2001.

In 1985, Dyer was alleged to be involved in an extra-marital relationship with a 16 year old minor. The accusations were never made public, and internal investigations led to no criminal charges against Dyer. According to an anonymous police source, Dyer admitted to having sex with the minor. In a 2001 Fresno Bee interview, Dyer refused to talk about the allegations, replying, “All I can tell you is that the relationships that I have had outside of my marriage, when I was a young man, have been dealt with. ... God’s forgiven me. My wife’s forgiven me. This department’s forgiven me and looked into a lot of things in my past.”

In 2001, deputy chiefs Robert Nevarez and Sharon Shaffer filed a lawsuit against Dyer. He was accused of creating a hostile work environment in the Fresno Police Department through making several racially and sexually insensitive comments. Fresno City Hall settled the lawsuit, paying $200,000 collectively to Nevarez and Shaffer. Dyer also was questioned by the media for neglectful supervision of his chief deputy who was convicted in 2017 of conspiring to distribute heroin and marijuana of which Dyer claimed he was unaware.

Dyer served as police chief for 18 years. He ran in the March 2020 election to succeed Lee Brand as mayor. He received a majority of the vote, bypassing the need for a runoff election. Dyer is the second former Fresno police chief to run for mayor and be elected after Mayor Truman G. Hart.

Dyer and his wife, Diane, have two children.

Electoral history

References

1959 births
21st-century American politicians
American municipal police chiefs
California Republicans
Living people
Mayors of Fresno, California
California State University, Fresno alumni
California State Polytechnic University, Pomona alumni
People from Fowler, California